Pike County Central High School (PCCHS) is a public high school located in Pikeville, Kentucky, United States.  The school mascot is a hawk. The school motto is "Soaring To Greatness". PCCHS serves around 700 students in 9th to 12th grade. It is located just minutes from the downtown Pikeville area. It features vocational schools and GED programs in addition to its regular courses.

History 
Pike County Central High School is the result of a consolidation, which brought together the former Johns Creek High School and Mullins High School in 1993.

The current principal, Dr. Timothy Cline, is the fifth in school history, and the first PCCHS alumnus to hold the office.  In the 2021–2022 academic school year, Dr. Cline replaced Taylor who took over for David Rowe who took over for Eddie McCoy after he took over for Roger Johnson, who vacated the job to take a position within the Pike County Board of Education. Johnson was the PCCHS principal since the inaugural school year of 1993.

Also in recent staff changes, the whole men's basketball coaching staff was renovated as Eric Ratliff became the new head coach.

In 2007 Pike County central's high school soccer team won the 32nd district.

Also, in 2007, the school's Wingspan journalism staff were the Kentucky High School Journalism Association's state champions. The Wingspan is sponsored by teacher Angela Lockhart.

The school's CATS test scores were impressive as well, as they placed first in their district, first in their region, and 28th in the state of Kentucky.

Pike County Central High school dance team was re-adopted in 2017.

References

External links 
 Website

Public high schools in Kentucky
Schools in Pike County, Kentucky
Educational institutions established in 1993
1993 establishments in Kentucky
Pikeville, Kentucky